Alferce is a freguesia (parish) in the Monchique Municipality (Algarve, Portugal). The population in 2011 was 441, in an area of 96.12 km².

References

Freguesias of Monchique